The Conseil des écoles catholiques du Centre-Est (CECCE, "Centre-East French Catholic School Board"), formerly known as the Conseil des écoles catholiques de langue française du Centre-Est (CECLFCE), is Ontario's largest French-language school board. The CECCE operates 41 elementary schools, 10 high schools, and a school for adults. Over 21,000 students from Junior Kindergarten to Grade 12 attend CECCE schools. The board employs approximately 2,000 teachers and professionals and it covers an area of 35,615 km2, including the City of Ottawa. Its headquarters are in the Gloucester area of Ottawa.

The predecessor school district, the Conseil des écoles catholiques de langue française de la région d'Ottawa-Carleton (CECLF), had its headquarters at the current CECCE headquarters; previously, Gloucester was a separate municipality.

See also

 List of schools of the Conseil des écoles catholiques du Centre-Est
List of school districts in Ontario
List of high schools in Ontario

References

External links
 Official site
 Official site 
 

Conseil
French-language school districts in Ontario
Roman Catholic school districts in Ontario
1998 establishments in Ontario
Educational institutions established in 1998